Jaunay-Clan is a former commune in the Vienne department in the Nouvelle-Aquitaine region in western France. On 1 January 2017, it was merged into the new commune Jaunay-Marigny. It is twinned with the town of Cavan, Ireland.

See also
 Futuroscope
Communes of the Vienne department

References

Former communes of Vienne